Yeeeah Baby is the second and final studio album by rapper Big Pun, released April 4, 2000 through Columbia Records, Loud Records and Fat Joe's Terror Squad Productions. It was released in April of the same year as planned, peaking at number 3 on the Billboard 200, and selling 179,000 units during the week it was released. It was subsequently certified Gold in July three months later and would go on to be certified Platinum on October 31, 2017. Fat Joe executive produced the album.

Struggling with morbid obesity, Pun experienced breathing problems throughout the album’s recording process, slowing down his signature flow. He died at 28 years of age, just two months before the album’s release.

Background

The album consists of two of Big Pun's biggest hits, the first single "It's So Hard" and the Puerto Rican anthem "100%". In the former song, he exclaims: "It's hard work, baby. I just lost 100 pounds. I'm trying to live. I ain't going nowhere."

In his last magazine interview, conducted by Industry Insider only a week before his death, Pun detailed that his approach on Yeeeah Baby was not as "hardcore" as his previous album Capital Punishment, in an attempt to reach out to an even wider fanbase than his debut album already had.

Tracks 

Terror Squad members and affiliates such as Sunkiss, Tony Sunshine, Prospect, Cuban Link, Remy Ma, and Fat Joe were featured on the album.

The album featured lighthearted songs like "100%" and "It's So Hard".  It opens with an introduction "The Creation", likening Big Pun to Frankenstein.  The first song "Watch Those" is a rock-oriented rap song with the beat derived from the theme song of Starsky and Hutch.  With Tony Sunshine, there were also jokey R&B ballads like "My Dick" and "Laughing at You", an interpretation of Notorious B.I.G.'s "Juicy" with lyrics like "It was all a scheme / I used to load the tech with the magazine". The track "Nigga Shit" is a two-minute skit where Pun jokes about indulging in African-American stereotypes.  There were also hardcore revenge-fantasy songs with a dark sinister sound like "Off With His Head", "LeatherFace" and "Wrong Ones". In the song "My Turn", Big Pun made a jab at a then up-and-coming rapper 50 Cent in response to the remark 50 made about Pun in his song "How to Rob".

Reception

Commercial
Yeeeah Baby posted a strong debut on the Billboard 200, the album sold more than 179,000 copies in its first week in stores to take the third slot on the chart. It reached Gold status within three months.

Critical
Yeeeah Baby received favorable reviews from music critics.
Rolling Stone (4/13/00, p. 128) – 3.5 stars out of 5 – "... [Pun] has gone out with a bang. He attacked standard hip-hop topics with witty, unpredictable elasticity. ... Pun is at his habanero hottest ..."
Q (7/00, p. 111) – 3 stars out of 5 – "... Would have established [him] as both a radio-friendly commercial force and rebellious icon ..."
CMJ (4/24/00, p. 30) – "... Beams the spotlight on the Boricua bomber's unparalleled breath control and hilarious jaw-dropping wordplay."
Vibe (6/00, p. 214) – "... A triumphant final effort for one of the Boogie Down Bronx's favorite super-lyrical sons....[It] showcases Pun's matured artistic vision and newly mastered flows but never ceases to move bodies and minds ..."
The Source (5/00, p. 186) – 4 mics out of 5 – "... An even more in-depth peep inside the heart and soul of a man in constant struggle with himself. ... a backstage pass to the all-out jam that was Pun's personality: street-wise, intellectually sharp, sex-crazed – and funny as hell ..."
NME (4/29/00, p. 35) – 7 out of 10 – "... [A] raucous final musical statement. ... like a library of every cool contemporary hip-hop sound squeezed onto one compact disc. ... One for delinquent work experience boys everywhere."

Track listing
Credits adapted from the album's liner notes.

Notes
 signifies a co-producer

Sample credits
 "Watch Those" contains a sample of "Gotcha (Theme from Starsky & Hutch)", written and performed by Tom Scott.
 "We Don't Care" contains excerpts from "Exclusively for Me", written by Colin Blunstone and David Jones.
 "New York Giants" contains a sample of "World Famous", written by Anne Dudley and Malcolm McLaren, performed by Malcolm McLaren.
 "My Dick" contains excerpts from "2 Hype", written by Eric Smith and Eric McCaine; and contains samples of "Jo Jo", written and performed by Gino Vannelli.
 "Leather Face" contains excerpts from "Redemption", written and performed by Bill Conti; and contains a sample from "Niggaz Done Started Something", written by Earl Simmons, Sean Jacobs, Jason Phillips, Mason Betha, David Styles, and Damon Blackman, performed by DMX featuring The Lox and Mase.
 "100%" contains samples from "Anita", written and performed by Lalo Schifrin.
 "Laughing at You" contains excerpts from "Don't You (Forget About Me)", written by Steve Schiff and Keith Forsey.

Album chart positions

Weekly charts

Year-end charts

Singles chart positions

Certifications

References

2000 albums
Big Pun albums
Albums published posthumously
Albums produced by Just Blaze
Albums produced by Buckwild
Albums produced by the Infinite Arkatechz